Streator Township High School, also known as Streator High School (SHS), is a high school located in Streator, Illinois, approximately 90 miles southwest of Chicago.

History
The school is named after its city's namesake, Worthy S. Streator. The original building for the school was financed by Streator's founder, Ralph Plumb.  The school graduated its first class in 1876.  There were seven students: one boy and six girls.

In 2012, the Men's Varsity Basketball team took home its first Regional Championship since 1969, by defeating Pontiac, 61–59.

Notable alumni
 Doug Dieken - Pro football player with the Cleveland Browns
 Thurlow Essington - Illinois lawyer and state senator
 Rube Novotney - Former MLB player (Chicago Cubs)
 Ernest Ramme - United States Air Force Brigader General
 Adam Shabala - Former MLB player (San Francisco Giants)
 Clay Zavada - Former MLB player and current minor league player (Arizona Diamondbacks)

References

External links
 Streator Township High School website

Public high schools in Illinois
 
Schools in LaSalle County, Illinois
1875 establishments in Illinois